Thiania is a genus of jumping spiders that was first described by Carl Ludwig Koch in 1846.

Species
 it contains twenty-three species, found in Asia from Pakistan to the Philippines, with one species found on Hawaii:
Thiania abdominalis Zabka, 1985 – China, Vietnam
Thiania aura Dyal, 1935 – Pakistan
Thiania bhamoensis Thorell, 1887 – India to Myanmar, Thailand, Laos, Indonesia (Sumatra, Bali)
Thiania cavaleriei Schenkel, 1963 – China
Thiania chrysogramma Simon, 1901 – China (Hong Kong)
Thiania coelestis (Karsch, 1880) – Philippines
Thiania cupreonitens (Simon, 1899) – Indonesia (Sumatra)
Thiania demissa (Thorell, 1892) – Indonesia
Thiania formosissima (Thorell, 1890) – Borneo
Thiania gazellae (Karsch, 1878) – New Guinea
Thiania humilis (Thorell, 1877) – Indonesia (Sulawesi)
Thiania inermis (Karsch, 1897) – China (Hong Kong)
Thiania jucunda Thorell, 1890 – Indonesia (Sumatra)
Thiania latefasciata (Simon, 1877) – Philippines
Thiania latibola Zhang & Maddison, 2012 – Malaysia
Thiania luteobrachialis Schenkel, 1963 – China
Thiania pulcherrima C. L. Koch, 1846 (type) – Sri Lanka, Vietnam, Malaysia, Indonesia (Sulawesi)
Thiania simplicissima (Karsch, 1880) – Philippines
Thiania sinuata Thorell, 1890 – Malaysia
Thiania suboppressa Strand, 1907 – China, Vietnam, Japan. Introduced to USA (Hawaii)
Thiania subserena Simon, 1901 – Malaysia
Thiania tenuis Zhang & Maddison, 2012 – Borneo
Thiania viscaensis Barrion & Litsinger, 1995 – Philippines

See also
 Thianella

References

External links
 Photograph of Thiania sp.

Salticidae genera
Salticidae
Spiders of Asia
Spiders of Hawaii
Taxa named by Carl Ludwig Koch